This article summarizes the world steel production by country.

In 2020, total world crude steel production was 1877.5 million tonnes (Mt).  The biggest steel producing country is currently China, which accounted for 57% of world steel production in 2020. In 2020, China became the first country to produce over one billion tons of steel. In 2008, 2009, 2015 and 2016 output fell in the majority of steel-producing countries as a result of the global recession. In 2010 and 2017, it started to rise again. Crude steel production contracted in all regions in 2019 except in Asia and the Middle East.

List of countries by steel production
This is a list of countries by steel production in 1967, 1980, 1990, 2000 and from 2007 to 2021, based on data provided by the World Steel Association. All countries with annual production of crude steel at least 2 million metric tons.

Exports
net: exports - imports

Imports
Net: imports − exports

See also
 Steel industry
 Global steel industry trends
 List of steel producers
 List of countries by iron ore production

References

External links 
 World Steel Association
 American Iron and Steel Institute

Steel industry by country
Lists of countries by production